Ibis Budget (stylised ibis budget) is a French economy hotel brand specialized in essential comfort at a budget price and owned by Accor. Created in 1992 in France under the name Etap Hôtel, the brand was renamed Ibis Budget in 2011. Ibis Budget manages 614 hotels in 20 countries (2018).

History

1992: Etap Hôtel 

After the successful launch of the budget hotel chain Formule 1 in 1985, the group Accor launched a new economy brand, Etap Hôtel, in 1992. By 2004, 229 Etap Hôtel locations opened in France, and 81 elsewhere in Europe. To fine-tune its economy segment, the Accor group privileged the development of Etap Hôtel over its other budget brand Formule 1.

2011: Ibis Budget 

In September 2011, Accor rebranded Etap Hôtel into Ibis Budget and All Seasons into ibis Styles, turning ibis into the group's economy megabrand. The "Sweet Bed" was rolled out throughout the ibis brands, the first bed entirely designed by a hotel group. The mattresses, pillows and digital access were upgraded. The lobby was turned into a living space. Following this restructuration, the ibis megabrand became the leading hotel operator in Europe in 2013 with 1,277 hotels. The first Ibis Budget opened in Tangier, Morocco, in November 2011.

In 2013, Ibis Budget became Spain's first super-economy hotel chain with 15 hotels in the country. The following year, still in Spain, Ibis Budget tested the installation of solar thermal collectors capable of yielding power on rainy days and during the night.

In April 2017, Ibis Budget introduced the new Nest rooms which include a pull-down bed. In January 2019, ibis Budget launched a discount offer for rainy days. In October 2019, Ibis Budget launched in Singapore.

The last remaining hotel with the old Etap name is located in Belfast.

Description 

Ibis budget is an economy hotel brand specialized in essential comfort at a budget price and owned by Accor. Ibis budget manages 614 hotels in 20 countries (2018).

Ibis budget is part of the ibis family, which also includes the brands ibis (red) and ibis Styles.

Development

Awards 
 2008: Best Interior Design prize for the Cocoon rooms by the European Hotel Design Awards

See also 
 Accor
 ibis
 ibis Styles

References

External links 
 

Accor
Etap Hôtel
French brands